Jon Melander is a retired American football offensive guard who played four seasons in the National Football League for the New England Patriots, the Cincinnati Bengals and the Denver Broncos.  He played college football at the University of Minnesota and was drafted in the fifth round of the 1990 NFL Draft.

College career 
Melander played for the University of Minnesota Golden Gophers from 1986 to 1989, starting as a defensive end before switching to guard just before his junior year. Melander earned a degree in business management with an emphasis in finance from the Carlson School of Management in 1989. From 2000 to 2004, Melander's nephew, Rian, was an All Big Ten offensive tackle for the Golden Gophers. His uncle, Raymond, also played football for the Gophers.

NFL career 
Melander was selected in the fifth round (113th overall) in the 1990 NFL draft by the New England Patriots. He played in ten games for the Patriots during the 1991 NFL season before signing with the Cincinnati Bengals before the 1992 NFL season. In 1992, Melander played in 15 games for the Bengals and started seven games. Melander signed with the Denver Broncos in the offseason and played in 29 games for the Broncos during the 1993 and 1994 NFL seasons. Melander started 22 games for the Broncos before retiring prior to the 1995 season.

Post-retirement 
Since retiring from football, Melander has worked as a financial consultant in the Twin Cities, specializing in asset management and retirement consulting for high-net-worth clients. In 2004, he was the President of the Minnetonka Rotary Club and is a past Rotary Assistant District Governor.

In addition to his career in finance, Jon volunteers his time coaching youth sports. He is also active in many church and community causes, and he remains an active Golden Gophers athletic booster.

References 

1966 births
American football offensive guards
Minnesota Golden Gophers football players
New England Patriots players
Cincinnati Bengals players
Businesspeople from Minnesota
Denver Broncos players
Living people
People from Fridley, Minnesota